Kyamakanda Secondary School is a government secondary school located in Kyamakanda Parish, Buyanja Subcounty, Rukungiri District of Uganda. It has both O level and A level with both boys and girls.

Foundation
Kyamakanda Secondary School is a church founded school under the management of North Kigezi Diocese.

References

Schools in Uganda
Rukungiri District